Girolamo Piccolomini (died 1535) was a Roman Catholic prelate who served as Bishop of Pienza (1510–1535) and Bishop of Montalcino (1510–1528).

Biography
On 9 December 1510, Girolamo Piccolomini was appointed during the papacy of Pope Julius II as both Bishop of Pienza and Bishop of Montalcino, replacing his father of the same name. He served as Bishop of Montalcino until his resignation on 20 November 1528. He served as Bishop of Pienza until his death in 1535.

References

External links and additional sources
 (for Chronology of Bishops) 
 (for Chronology of Bishops) 
 (for Chronology of Bishops) 
 (for Chronology of Bishops) 

16th-century Italian Roman Catholic bishops
Bishops appointed by Pope Julius II
1535 deaths
Bishops of Pienza